A linklog is a type of blog which is meant to act as a linked list.  Common practice is for the post titles to link directly to an external URLs, and the content of the post includes information to complement the associated URL.

Linklogs existed as a feature of computing systems before the internet as well.  In distributed file systems a link log was a method of recording data in which a record is created and added to the proper log when updating a transaction.  The format of a log record closely matches the specification of the transaction type it corresponds to.  Link log records consisted of two parts in such a system:  a set of type-independent fields, and a set of type-specific fields.  The former set consists of pointers to the preceding and succeeding records of the log.

In PBX systems such as AUDIX link-logs were a collection of data collecting to assist operators in maintaining the system.

Linklog software
 Linkwalla - A lightweight link blogging engine 
 Delicious, a social bookmarking web service - Now Defunct

See also
 Microblogging

External links

 The Ruby and Rails community linklog
 Tony Finch's linklog

References

Internet terminology
Blogs
Computer-mediated communication
Internet culture
Information systems
Web syndication
Web syndication formats